Svetlana Popa is a Moldovan politician.

Biography 

Svetlana Popa served as the leader of the communist faction in the Chişinău Municipal Council. She has been a member of the Parliament of Moldova since 2009. On March 17, 2010, Svetlana Popa left the Party of Communists of the Republic of Moldova.

References

External links 
 Site-ul Parlamentului Republicii Moldova
 Plenara PCRM: un nou secretar executiv și două demisii

1964 births
Living people
Moldovan MPs 2009–2010
Moldovan female MPs
Party of Communists of the Republic of Moldova politicians
21st-century Moldovan women politicians